was a Japanese poet and literary critic. He pioneered the collaborative poetic form renshi in the 1990s, in which he has collaborated with such well-known literary figures as Charles Tomlinson, James Lasdun, Joseph Stanton, Shuntarō Tanikawa and Mikirō Sasaki.

Asahi Shimbun
Ōoka's poetry column was published without a break seven days a week for more than 20 years on the front page of Asahi Shimbun, which is Japan's leading national newspaper.

Awards
1993:	Cultural Prize of the Municipality of Tokyo
1993:	Officier de l'Ordre des Arts et des Lettres (France)
1995:	Japan Academy of the Arts Prize for poetry and criticism
1996:	Asahi Prize
1996:	Golden Wreath of the Struga Poetry Evenings, Macedonia
1997:	Cultural Merit Award
2002:	Japan Foundation Award

Bibliography
The Japanese and Mt. Fuji (Tokyo: Graphic-sha, 1984)
Uta no saijiki (Gakushu Kenkyusha, 1985)
A Play of Mirrors: Eight Major Poets of Modern Japan (Santa Fe: Katydid Books, 1987)
The World of Sam Francis (Ogawa Art Foundation, 1987)
A String Around Autumn = Aki O Tatamu Himo: Selected Poems, 1952–1980 (Santa Fe: Katydid Books, 1988)
Gustave Moreau Caste of Dreams (Tokyo: Parco, 1988)
Elegy and the Benediction: Selected Poems 1947–1989 (Santa Fe: Katydid Books, 1991)
The Colors of Poetry: Essays on Classic Japanese Verse (Santa Fe: Katydid Books, 1991. Co-authors: Thomas Fitzsimmons, Donald Keene, Takako Lento, Thomas Lento)
A Poet's Anthology: The Range of Japanese Poetry (Santa Fe: Katydid Books, 1994. Translated into English by Janine Beichman)
What the Kite Thinks: A Linked Poem, by Makoto Ōoka, Wing Tek Lum, Joseph Stanton, and Jean Yamasaki Toyama (Manoa: University of Hawaii Press, 1994)
Beneath the Sleepless Tossing of the Planets (Hawaii: Univ of Hawaii Press, 1995. With Tsujii Takashi)
The Poetry and Poetics of Ancient Japan (Santa Fe: Katydid Books, 1997. Translated into English by Thomas Fitzsimmons)
Dans l'océan du silence (Paris: Voix d'encre, 1998. Translated into French by Dominique Palmé)
Oriori no Uta: Poems for all seasons (Tokyo: Kodansha International, 2000. Translated into English by Janine Beichman)
Love Songs from the Man'yoshu: Selections from a Japanese Classic (Tokyo: Kodansha International, 2000)
Voix d'Argile: Fance Franck (Paris: Bayle a Montelimar, 2001)

Notes

External links
 Makoto Ooka, Poetry International

1931 births
2017 deaths
Deaths from respiratory failure
Recipients of the Legion of Honour
Recipients of the Order of Culture
Struga Poetry Evenings Golden Wreath laureates
20th-century Japanese poets